Sarrameanaceae is a family of lichen-forming fungi in the monotypic order Sarrameanales. It contains two genera, Loxospora, and Sarrameana, the type genus. The family was circumscribed by Josef Hafellner in 1984. The order Sarrameanales was proposed by Brendan Hodkinson and James Lendemer in 2011, as they had noted that previously published large-scale molecular phylogenetic studies had shown that the group of species contained in the family Sarrameanaceae were distinct and separate from the clade containing all of the other orders of the Ostropomycetidae. However, the name Sarrameanales was not validly published according to the rules of botanical nomenclature, because it was not accompanied by a suitable description. Despite this, the order continues to be used in lichenological literature.

Sarrameanales is in the Ostropomycetidae; within this subclass, Sarrameanales and the order Schaereriales form a clade which has a sister relationship with a clade containing the orders Baeomycetales and Pertusariales.

References

Lecanoromycetes
Lecanoromycetes families
Taxa described in 1984
Taxa named by Josef Hafellner
Lichen families